Metopoceras duseutrei is a moth of the family Noctuidae. It is found in Morocco, Algeria and Mauritania.

Adults are on wing from March to April.

External links
species info

Metopoceras